Kallindoia is a former municipality in the Thessaloniki regional unit, Greece. Since the 2011 local government reform it is part of the municipality Lagkadas, of which it is a municipal unit. The 2011 census recorded 3,592 inhabitants in the municipal unit. The municipal unit of Kallindoia covers an area of 154.748 km2. The seat of the municipality was in Zagliveri.

See also 
 List of settlements in the Thessaloniki regional unit
 Petrokerasa Folklore Museum

References 

Populated places in Thessaloniki (regional unit)